Suberedamines are bio-active isolates of Suberea, a marine sponge. The compounds are brominated tyrosine dimer derivatives.

References

Extra reading

Sponge biology
Bromoarenes
Methoxy compounds
Tertiary amines
Amides